The Moon in the Mirror is a 1990 Chilean drama film written and directed by Silvio Caiozzi.  It was entered into the main competition at the 47th Venice International Film Festival; for her performance Gloria Münchmeyer won the Volpi Cup for best actress. The film was selected as the Chilean entry for the Best Foreign Language Film at the 63rd Academy Awards, but was not accepted as a nominee.

Plot 
In the enchanting port of Valparaíso, an elderly and ailing sailor named Don Arnaldo (played by Rafael Benavente) lives in seclusion with his obedient and submissive son, El Gordo (played by Ernesto Beadle, with the voice of Roberto Poblete). Don Arnaldo controls all the movements in the house from his bed, using the mirrors hanging on the walls of his bedroom. However, El Gordo longs for freedom, which he finally finds after meeting Lucrecia (played by Gloria Münchmeyer). But this rebellion angers Don Arnaldo, who will stop at nothing to regain control over his son.

Cast 
 Gloria Münchmeyer : Lucrecia
 Rafael Benavente : Don Arnaldo
 Ernesto Beadle : El Gordo

See also
 List of submissions to the 63rd Academy Awards for Best Foreign Language Film
 List of Chilean submissions for the Academy Award for Best Foreign Language Film

References

External links

1990 films
1990 drama films
Chilean drama films
1990s Spanish-language films